John Quincy Smith (November 5, 1824 – December 30, 1901) was an American farmer, politician and legislator from Ohio. He served in the United States House of Representatives for one term from 1873 to 1875, as well as commissioner of Indian Affairs from 1875 through 1877. Prior to this, he served in both the Ohio Senate and Ohio House of Representatives.

Early life and career 
John Q. Smith was born to Thomas Edward Smith (1783–1841) and Mary Kennedy Whitehill (1788–1849), natives of Virginia, on their Warren County, Ohio, farm near Waynesville. A voracious reader, his early schooling was limited because of his duties on the family farm, but his father believed in the advantages of an education, so that John Quincy was able to spend a short time at Miami University.

In July 1852, Smith married Lydia Emeline Evans, a native of Warren county. They had six children, one of whom died in childhood. In 1854, he relocated his young family to Clinton County, Ohio.

Political career 
He was elected to the Ohio Senate in 1859 as a Republican. In Columbus, during the legislative sessions, Smith's roommate was James A. Garfield, who was just starting out on his public career, and other intimate acquaintances were John Sherman and Ulysses S. Grant. In 1861, he was elected to the Ohio House of Representatives and served two years. In 1870, he was elected as a member of the Ohio State Board of Equalization. He was again elected State Senator in 1871.

Congress 
In 1872, Smith was elected to Congress from Ohio's Third Congressional District. In 1874, he was renominated for Congress, but defeated by John S. Savage.

Federal roles
Smith was appointed Commissioner of Indian Affairs in the Grant Administration on December 11, 1875. His administration saw several controversies, including the Great Sioux War of 1876-77 (including the Battle of the Little Bighorn), the removal of the Ponca Indians to Indian Territory and charges of corruption against his chief clerk, Samuel Galpin. He was removed from office on September 27, 1877.

President Rutherford B. Hayes appointed Smith as United States consul general to Montreal, Quebec, Canada, serving from 1878 until he resigned in 1882.

Later career and death 
He remained an ardent Republican until President Grover Cleveland's first administration, when he allied himself with the Democratic party because of his views on tariff reform, and thereafter he remained a Democrat. His published articles on tariff in the New York Evening Post attracted wide attention throughout the country and were extensively quoted by the press and on the stump.

Smith left public life and retired to his farm, "Sycamores", in Oakland where he died. He is buried in Miami Cemetery, Waynesville, Ohio.

Notes

Sources 

 Taylor, William A. Ohio in Congress from 1803 to 1901. Columbus, Ohio: The XX Century Publishing Company, 1901.
 History of Clinton County, Ohio. Chicago: W. H. Beers & Co., 1882.

External links 
 

1824 births
1901 deaths
19th-century American diplomats
Republican Party members of the Ohio House of Representatives
Miami University alumni
Republican Party Ohio state senators
People from Clinton County, Ohio
People from Waynesville, Ohio
United States Bureau of Indian Affairs personnel
19th-century American politicians
Republican Party members of the United States House of Representatives from Ohio